The Brilliance H330 sedan and Brilliance H320 hatchback duo are compact cars (C) produced by Brilliance Auto aimed to replace the Brilliance BS2 series.

Brilliance H330
The Brilliance H330 sedan was launched on the Chinese car market in April 2013. Pricing ranges from 65,800 yuan to 75,800 yuan. The Brilliance H330 sedan is the successor of the Brilliance Junjie FSV sedan, and it is actually a heavy facelift based on the FSV sedan.

Brilliance H320
The Brilliance H320 hatchback debuted at the 2012 Chengdu Auto Show. Pricing starts from 63,800 yuan to 78,800 yuan. The Brilliance H320 hatchback is the successor of the Brilliance Junjie FRV.

Gallery

References

External links
Brilliance H330 website

H330
Cars of China
Compact cars
2010s cars
Front-wheel-drive vehicles
Cars introduced in 2012